San Antonio de Cachi or Kachi (Quechua for "salt") is one of the nineteen districts of the Andahuaylas Province in Peru.

Geography 
Other mountains are listed below:

Ethnic groups 
The people in the district are mainly indigenous citizens of Quechua descent. Quechua is the language which the majority of the population (94.41%) learnt to speak in childhood, 5.22% of the residents started speaking using the Spanish language (2007 Peru Census).

References

Districts of the Andahuaylas Province
Districts of the Apurímac Region